Menemerus desertus is a jumping spider species in the genus Menemerus that lives in Algeria. It was first described by Wanda Wesołowska in 1999. The female and male are very distinctive. The female is larger,  in length, with characteristic ridges.

References

Fauna of Algeria
Salticidae
Spiders of Africa
Spiders described in 1999
Taxa named by Wanda Wesołowska